Devillers is a French surname. Notable people with the surname include:

 Arnaud Devillers, Roman Catholic priest
 Charles Joseph Devillers (1724–1810), French naturalist
 Henri Devillers (1914–1942), French Nazi collaborator
 Yves Devillers (born 1948), French sportsman

See also
 David M. DeVillers (born 1966), U.S. Attorney
 Julia DeVillers (born 1967), American writer
 Paul DeVillers (born 1946), Canadian politician
 De Villiers, a surname

French-language surnames